Christopher Drew may refer to:

Christopher Drew (journalist), U.S. investigative reporter 
Christofer Drew (born 1991), lead singer of the band Never Shout Never
Chris Akins (Christopher Drew Akins, born 1976),  U.S football player